Moosa is a village in Mansa District, Punjab State, India.

Moosa is known for well known singer Sidhu Moosewala a.k.a Shubdeep Sidhu.

Notable people
 Sidhu Moose Wala, singer and rapper whose stage name references the village of Moosa where he was born.

References

Villages in Mansa district, India